Bryotropha hodgesi is a moth of the family Gelechiidae. It is found along the western coast of the United States, north to the extreme southern part of Canada.

The forewings are ochreous brown and the hindwings are pale brownish, but darker towards the apex. In California, adults have been recorded on wing from mid March to early October. In Canada, adults were collected from late June to mid September. This means there might be two generations per year in the southern part of its range, while there probably is just one generation in the northern part.

Etymology
The species is named in honour of R.W. Hodges.

References

External links

Moths described in 2004
Moths of North America
hodgesi